"Love Is All I Got" is a song by electronic musicians Feed Me and Crystal Fighters. It was written by Sebastian Pringle, Gilbert Vierich, Graham Dickson, and Jon Gooch.

It was digitally released as a single on 26 October 2012 by mau5trap.

Critical reception 
Reed Tan of The Daily Princetonian said the track "features Feed Me operating in a brighter space than he’s usually prone to occupying – the Crystal Fighters' vocals take center stage until the drop, where Feed Me's signature grinding bass sounds still manage to feel uplifting."

Music video 
The music video for the song premiered on 19 September 2012. It was directed by Christopher Barrett and Luke Taylor, and is starring Christian Kinde and Alexandra Dowling. As of November 2022, it has over 7.9 million views on YouTube.

Track listing

Charts

Release history

References

External links 
 

2012 singles
Crystal Fighters songs
2012 songs